The Left Party (French: , PG) is a left-wing democratic-socialist political party in France, founded in 2009 by Jean-Luc Mélenchon and Marc Dolez after their departure from the Socialist Party (PS). The PG claims to bring together personalities and groups from different political traditions; it claims a socialist, ecologist and republican orientation.

Politically located between the Socialist Party and the French Communist Party, the Left Party intends to federate all the sensitivities of the anti-liberal left—which they also call "the other left"—within the same alliance. In 2008, the PG joined forces with the Communist Party of the United Left and six other left-wing and far-left organizations in the coalition of the Left Front, of which Jean-Luc Mélenchon was the candidate for the presidential election.

The PG was co-chaired from 2010 by Jean-Luc Mélenchon and Martine Billard. In 2016, the Left Party had 8,000 members. At the end of 2014, Jean-Luc Mélenchon and Martine Billard resigned, and the party leadership was then collectively ensured by the national secretariat. The weekly newspaper, L'Intérêt général (formerly À gauche) is sent to all members but also to simple subscribers. It is printed at more than 15,000 copies a week.

In 2016, in view of the presidential and legislative elections of the following year, Jean-Luc Mélenchon formed a new movement, La France Insoumise, that the Left Party helped to animate.

History

It was founded in November 2008 by former Socialist senator Jean-Luc Mélenchon, deputy Marc Dolez, and other dissidents of the party together with the  movement ("Movement for a Republican and Social Alternative").

They had left the  five days earlier, in protest of the result of the Reims Congress vote on motions, where the leftist motion they supported won only 19%.

They were joined after by other members from the left of the Socialist Party, by people who hadn't been members of a political party before, and by dissidents from the Green Party following the deputy Martine Billard.

In 2010 the PG was accepted into the Party of European Left.

In November 2013, the  joined the international Boycott, Divestment and Sanctions (BDS) campaign against Israel.

Co-presidents and co-founders Mélenchon and  stepped down from office in 2014.
Since its 2015 congress, the party is led by its coordinators and spokespersons Éric Coquerel and Danielle Simonnet.

On 2 July 2018 the party withdrew from the Party of European Left, disagreeing with the presence of the Greek left-wing party Syriza in the alliance.

Elected officials
 Member of the European Parliament: Jean-Luc Mélenchon

Around 90 locally-elected officials (municipal, regional and general councillors), including two members of the Council of Paris, initially joined the party. This number has dropped since then.

Popular support and electoral record
The PG has yet to run independently in an election, so support base is difficult to quantify.

National Assembly

European Parliament

References

External links
 

2008 establishments in France
Alter-globalization
Democratic socialist parties in Europe
Eurosceptic parties in France
La France Insoumise
Non-governmental organizations involved in the Israeli–Palestinian conflict
Parties represented in the European Parliament
Party of the European Left former member parties
Political parties established in 2008
Political parties of the French Fifth Republic
Socialist parties in France
Jean-Luc Mélenchon